The 2017–18 Philippine Basketball Association (PBA) Philippine Cup was the first conference of the 2017–18 PBA season. The tournament started on December 17, 2017, and ended on April 6, 2018. The tournament does not allow teams to hire foreign players or imports.

Format
The following format will be observed for the duration of the conference: 
 Single-round robin eliminations; 11 games per team; Teams are then seeded by basis on win–loss records.
Top eight teams will advance to the quarterfinals. In case of tie, playoff games will be held only for the #8 seed.
Quarterfinals:
QF1: #1 vs #8 (#1 twice-to-beat)
QF2: #2 vs #7 (#2 twice-to-beat)
QF3: #3 vs #6 (best-of-3 series)
QF4: #4 vs #5 (best-of-3 series)
Semifinals (best-of-7 series):
SF1: QF1 Winner vs. QF4 Winner
SF2: QF2 Winner vs. QF3 Winner
Finals (best-of-7 series)
F1: SF1 Winner vs SF2 Winner

Elimination round

Team standings

Schedule

Results

Eighth seed playoff

Bracket

Quarterfinals

(1) San Miguel vs. (8) TNT

(2) Magnolia vs. (7) GlobalPort

(3) Alaska vs. (6) NLEX

(4) Barangay Ginebra vs. (5) Rain or Shine

Semifinals

(1) San Miguel vs. (4) Barangay Ginebra

(2) Magnolia vs. (6) NLEX

Finals

Awards

Conference
Best Player of the Conference: June Mar Fajardo 
Finals MVP: June Mar Fajardo

Players of the Week

Statistics

Individual statistical leaders

Individual game highs

Team statistical leaders

References

External links
 PBA Official Website

Philippine Cup
PBA Philippine Cup